Arboroharamiya is an extinct genus of early mammal (or possibly a non-mammalian mammaliaform) from the Middle Jurassic Tiaojishan Formation of Inner Mongolia, China. Arboroharamiya belongs to a group of mammaliaforms called Haramiyida. The type species Arboroharamiya jenkinsi was described in the journal Nature in 2013 alongside a description of the closely related haramiyidan Megaconus. Unlike Megaconus, which is thought to have been ground-dwelling, Arboroharamiya was arboreal. It has a long tail that might have been prehensile, and very long fingers. Based on the shape of its teeth, Arboroharamiya might have been an omnivore or a seed eater. Recent interpretations of its specimen suggest that it possessed patagia and was a glider.

When Arboroharamiya was included in a phylogenetic analysis of early mammals and mammaliaforms, Haramiyida was found to be a group within Mammalia, the true mammals. However, Megaconus was included in a different phylogenetic analysis, and that analysis placed Haramiyida outside Mammalia as a more basal ("primitive") group of mammaliaforms. The classification of Arboroharamiya and other haramiyidans as true mammals fits with what most previous studies have found, but since Arboroharamiya and Megaconus were not included in the same phylogenetic analysis, their position within Mammaliaformes remains uncertain.

Description
Arboroharamiya is the largest known haramiyidan, estimated to have weighed about 354 g. It has several features in common with living mammals, including a lower jaw formed by a single bone, the dentary, and hands and feet that each have four fingers with three bones each and one finger with two bones. Arboroharamiya is unlike any modern mammal in having a lower jaw that can move up, down, and backward, but not forward. It has a rodent-like dentition with enlarged incisors and molars and no canines. A rodent-like dentition is also seen in Multituberculata, an early group of mammals that might be closely related to Arboroharamiya, but it probably evolved independently in Arboroharamiya.

Relationships
Arboroharamiya belongs to a clade or evolutionary grouping called Mammaliaformes, which includes mammals and their closest extinct relatives from the Triassic and Jurassic periods. Within Mammaliaformes, Arboroharamiya falls within the clade Haramiyida. Haramiyidans have been known since the 1840s, but only from fossilized teeth and a single partial lower jaw. However, several features of the teeth have shown for many years that haramiyidans are among the most basal of mammaliaforms. Recent phylogenetic analyses, or analyses of evolutionary relationships, differ on whether or not haramiyidans are true mammals in the crown group Mammalia (the clade including the most recent common ancestor of living mammals, and all its descendants). Some analyses place Haramiyida outside crown group Mammalia, meaning that they diverged from other mammaliaforms before the most recent common ancestor of living mammals appeared. Other analyses place Haramiyida within Mammalia as part of an extinct group of Mesozoic mammals called Allotheria, which also includes Multituberculata. When Arboroharamiya itself was incorporated into a phylogenetic analysis, Haramiyida fell within Allotheria as a group within Mammalia. Below is a cladogram or evolutionary tree from the analysis:

References

Fossil taxa described in 2013
Middle Jurassic synapsids of Asia
Euharamiyids
Prehistoric cynodont genera
Paleontology in Inner Mongolia
Taxa named by Xiaoting Zheng
Taxa named by Shundong Bi
Taxa named by Xiaoli Wang (paleontologist)
Taxa named by Jin Meng